Geschichte und Gesellschaft: Zeitschrift fuer Historische Sozialwissenschaft (History and society. Journal of Historical Social Science) is a quarterly peer-reviewed academic journal covering the historical social sciences. It is published by Vandenhoeck & Ruprecht.

Abstracting and indexing

The journal is abstracted and indexed in:

Arts and Humanities Citation Index

EBSCO databases

International Bibliography of Periodical Literature

International Bibliography of the Social Sciences

Scopus

References 

History journals
Quarterly journals
Publications established in 1975
Multilingual journals